The 1987–88 Vancouver Canucks season was the team's 18th in the National Hockey League (NHL).

Offseason

Regular season
The Canucks had a very disappointing season, they were not capable of winning 3 games in a row during the season. However after the season they were able to draft future captain Trevor Linden.

Final standings

Schedule and results

Playoffs
Did not qualify for the second season in a row.

Player statistics

Note: GP = Games played; G = Goals; A = Assists; Pts = Points; +/- = Plus/Minus; PIM = Penalty Minutes

Awards and records

Transactions

Draft picks
Vancouver's draft picks at the 1987 NHL Entry Draft held at the Joe Louis Arena in Detroit, Michigan. The Canucks attempted to select Chris Gillies in the second round of the 1987 NHL Supplemental Draft, but the claim was ruled invalid since Gillies entered school after age 20 and therefore did not meet eligibility requirements.

Farm teams

See also
1987–88 NHL season

References

External links

Vancouver Canucks seasons
Vancouver C
Vancouver